Cotys II or Kotys II can refer to two kings of Thrace:

 Cotys II (Odrysian), ruled ca. 300-280 BC
 Cotys II (Sapaean), ruled 42–15 BC